Acta Sociologica is a quarterly peer-reviewed academic journal covering all areas of sociology. It is an official journal of the Nordic Sociological Association and was established in 1955.  It publishes papers on original research, book reviews, and essays and focusses on research comparing Nordic countries with one another or with other countries.

Abstracting and indexing 
Acta Sociologica is abstracted and indexed in Scopus and the Social Sciences Citation Index. According to the Journal Citation Reports, its 2016 impact factor is 1.225, ranking it 57th out of 143 journals in the category "Sociology".

External links 
 
 Nordic Sociological Association

Sociology journals
English-language journals
Publications established in 1955
Quarterly journals
SAGE Publishing academic journals